John George Lewis (born 9 May 1954) is an English former professional footballer who played in the Football League as a midfielder. He also played non-league football for clubs including Romford, Walthamstow Avenue and Tilbury. He represented England at youth level.

References

1954 births
Living people
Footballers from the London Borough of Hackney
English footballers
England youth international footballers
Association football midfielders
Tottenham Hotspur F.C. players
Leyton Orient F.C. players
Romford F.C. players
Walthamstow Avenue F.C. players
Tilbury F.C. players
English Football League players